The 22707 / 22708 Visakhapatnam – Tirupati AC Double Decker Express is a superfast train belonging to South Coast Railways of Indian Railways connecting Visakhapatnam and Tirupati both in the Indian state of Andhra Pradesh.

Previously this train was introduced between Kacheguda (Hyderabad)– section as Guntur–Kacheguda AC Double Decker Express & Kacheguda (Hyderabad)– section as Kacheguda–Tirupati Double Decker Express, but both trains were not successful on those routes due to low commuter traveling. So this train was canceled on those routes and transferred on a busy and profitable route i.e. Visakhapatnam - Tirupati section.

Stoppages

This train stops at Duvvada, Anakapalle, Tuni, Samalkot Jn, Rajahmundry, Tadepalligudem, Eluru, Vijayawada Junction, New Guntur, Tenali Jn, Chirala, Ongole, Nellore, Gudur Jn, Sri Kalahasti & Renigunta Jn.

Coach composition 
The train has 9 AC Chair cars, 2 power cars (Total 11 coaches)

Schedule
The schedule of this 22707/22708 Visakhapatnam - Tirupati AC Double Decker Express is given below:-

Traction

It is hauled by a  based WAP 7 locomotive on its entire journey.

References

External links
 22707 at India Rail Info
 22708 at India Rail Info

Transport in Visakhapatnam
Transport in Tirupati
Double-decker trains of India
Rail transport in Andhra Pradesh
Railway services introduced in 2016